Zhongshan Station may refer to:

 Zhongshan railway station in Guangdong, China
 Zhongshan metro station, on the Taipei Metro, Taiwan
 Zhongshan Station (Antarctica), a Chinese research base
 , a bus station in Zhongshan, Guangdong, China

See also
 Nakayama Station (disambiguation)
 Zhongshan Park Station (disambiguation)
 Zhongshan (disambiguation)